Walter Everett is a music theorist specializing in popular music who teaches at the University of Michigan.

His books include The Beatles as Musicians: Revolver through the Anthology (1999), which has been called "the most important work to appear on the Beatles thus far", and its follow-up volume, The Beatles as Musicians: The Quarry Men through Rubber Soul (2001). He also wrote The Foundations of Rock: From 'Blue Suede Shoes' to 'Suite: Judy Blue Eyes''' (2008) and has contributed to titles in the Cambridge Companions to Music series.

Gary Burns, editor of the journal Popular Music and Society, describes Everett's Beatles as Musicians volumes as a "monumental two-book set" that has furthered the field of musicological study begun in 1973 by Wilfrid Mellers. According to Michael Frontani, author of The Beatles: Image and the Media, the books represent a "landmark of scholarship" about the band's music.

Everett received the Kjell Meling Award for Distinction in the Arts and Humanities.

Education
BS, Gettysburg College music education, piano concentration
MM, University of Cincinnati College-Conservatory of Music music theory 
PhD, University of Michigan, music theory 

WorksExpression in Pop-Rock Music : A Collection of Critical and Analytical Essays (as editor) (1999)The Beatles as Musicians: Revolver through the Anthology (1999)The Beatles as Musicians: The Quarry Men through Rubber Soul (2001)The Foundations of Rock: From "Blue Suede Shoes" to "Suite: Judy Blue Eyes" (2009)What Goes On: The Beatles, Their Music, and Their Time (with Tim Riley) (2019)

Sources

External links
"Walter T. Everett: Professor of Music Theory", Music.UMich.edu''.

Living people
American music theorists
Year of birth missing (living people)
Place of birth missing (living people)
University of Michigan School of Music, Theatre & Dance alumni
University of Michigan faculty
Gettysburg College alumni
University of Cincinnati – College-Conservatory of Music alumni